This is a list of Billboard magazine's Top Hot 100 songs of 1994.

See also
1994 in music
List of Billboard Hot 100 number-one singles of 1994
List of Billboard Hot 100 top-ten singles in 1994

References

1994 record charts
Billboard charts